Two ships of the Royal Navy have borne the name HMS New Zealand, after the country of New Zealand, a third was cancelled while under construction:

  was a  launched in 1904, renamed HMS Zealandia in 1911 to free the name for the new battlecruiser, and sold in 1921.
  was an  paid for by the Dominion of New Zealand and launched in 1911. She served during the First World War and was sold in 1922.
She was cancelled in 1946 while under construction.

Battle honours
Ships named New Zealand have earned the following battle honours:
Heligoland, 1914
Dogger Bank, 1915
Jutland, 1916

Royal Navy ship names